The Minister for Infrastructure is a minister in the Government of New South Wales with responsibility for public infrastructure across New South Wales, Australia.

The current Minister for Infrastructure is Rob Stokes, who is also the Minister for Cities and Minister for Active Transport, and was sworn in on 21 December 2021. In the second Perrottet ministry since December 2021, it is one of the six ministries in the transport sector and the Minister (for Infrastructure, Cities and Active Transport) works with the Minister for Transport, the Minister for Metropolitan Roads and the Minister for Regional Transport and Roads. Together they administer the portfolio through the Department of Transport (Transport for NSW) and a range of other government agencies that coordinate funding arrangements for transport operators, including hundreds of local and community transport operators.

Role and responsibilities
Infrastructure was first represented at a portfolio level in the fourth Carr ministry, combined with Planning. The minister, Craig Knowles, also held the portfolio of Natural Resources and was responsible for the Department of Infrastructure, Planning and Natural Resources. The government's stated purpose in establishing a combined department was:
to form one department for the purpose of making integrated decisions about natural resource management and land use planning; that is to bring the social, economic and environmental agendas together to promote sustainability;
improve service delivery and provide clear, concise and co-ordinated information to customers;
to simplify policy and regulation to resolve confusion and duplication;
to reduce costs and redirect savings back to the community;
to link decisions about vital infrastructure with the broader plans for NSW; and
to devolve decision making to the communities that those decisions affect.

Infrastructure was established as a separate portfolio in the first Iemma ministry, however it was not responsible for a department nor legislation The portfolio was combined with planning in the O'Farrell ministry before being split into separate portfolios in the first Baird ministry. The portfolio was then combined with Transport in the second Baird ministry, before being abolished in the second Berejiklian ministry, subsumed into Transport. The portfolio was recreated in the second Perrottet ministry.

From December 2021 the minister is responsible for Barangaroo and Infrastructure NSW.

List of ministers

See also 

List of New South Wales government agencies

References

External links 
Transport for New South Wales

Infrastructure